Vote Loki is a four-part comic book series published by Marvel Comics from June 2016 to August 2016 as a satire about the 2016 United States presidential election. Written by comic book creator Christopher Hastings, the series is centered around Loki's controversial political campaign for President of the United States and fictional reporter Nisa Contreras's attempt to prove his duplicity. When Loki's unconventional campaign — centered on the fact that he would have "the guts" to lie outright to the American people, as opposed to the majority of politicians who would just lie — takes off with a surprising amount of support, only Nisa Contreras, young journalist for the Daily Bugle, seems to be undeceived by this promise for change. The tagline for the series is "BeLIEve", playing on one of the central themes of the issues, deception.

None of the issues have individual titles, and aside from the mention of 'Buzzfeed', the comic is mostly clear to not directly reference any companies or direct cultural sensations — rather than 'Twitter', there is 'Twotter', and none of the presidential candidates are mentioned by name. 

The compiled edition of all four issues also includes the Loki stories from Journey into Mystery issue #85 (1962), and from Avengers issue #300 (1989), re-telling Loki's comics role in creating the Avengers.

Plot

Issue #1
The first issue of the series (cover art by Tradd Moore) introduces main character Nisa Contreras, a Daily Bugle journalist. The issue starts off with a flashback showing the well-known battle between the Avengers and Loki in New York City from "several years ago" and its aftermath, focusing on young Nisa Contreras, while the next flashback shows her exposing an embezzling governor. Then the issue goes back to the present day, where Nisa and a bunch of other journalists are at the 'Kramco Stadium' waiting for the two main presidential candidates to come out for a debate. While talking with another reporter "Lucas" from Buzzfeed, Nisa notices that many reporters have identification badges that look different from her own. Just as she comes to said realization, it is revealed that the suspicious reporters are actually armed Hydra agents. However, before they can hurt anyone, 'Lucas from Buzzfeed' reveals himself to be the god Loki in disguise, stopping all of the criminals, and during his interrogation by the assembled reporters, he rebuts a question about whom he would potentially vote for by saying that both candidates are indirect and liars, adding that if he were the President, he'd lie directly to America's face. The scene then cuts to the people's reception of this news, showing mostly amused and positive reactions and the discussion and reception of said news about and sometimes with Loki. While Loki is on a talk show with J. Jonah Jameson, former editor-in-chief and publisher of the Daily Bugle, Nisa calls in, revealing the cause of her mistrust of Loki- his having destroyed her old home and his only seeking power. The latter then teleports into her apartment, and after a short conversation, gives her the address of his headquarters at her request. Upon entering the building, Nisa is greeted by 'Angela', Loki's sister, there to provide security, and by Loki himself, this time appearing not a man but as a woman in business clothing. Afterwards, Nisa writes a scathing article about the god of lies and sends it to her editor, only to find in the morning that Loki has convinced him to change the title from 'Loki will burn Washington' to a much more positive 'Loki's Campaign Something to get Excited About'. The issue ends with an outraged female Thor appearing at Nisa's door.

Issue #2
The second issue of Vote Loki opens up with an ad made by Loki's campaign, showing an eight-year-old girl who might be potentially threatened by Octavio Von Bardas, leader of Doom's Children, a Latverian terrorist organization. The ad continues by claiming that both candidates asked for a Skype meeting with the man rather than a drone strike and ends with Loki himself saying that sometimes, one must fight. After a scene where Governor Hitt, whom Nisa revealed was embezzling state funds, talks to a talk show host Billy McRiver, the issue goes back to Nisa herself and Thor, who, after reading the article, realizes that the title did not actually reflect what was written and is therefore appeased. Unfortunately, it is revealed that Thor cannot bring Loki back to Asgard due to its own political turmoil, and that she and the other Avengers are not comfortable with political interference- but she does slip Nisa a clue about one of Loki's main funders, the 'America the Faithful Fund'. The issue goes on to one of Loki's rallies in Texas, where he continues to play upon his main selling point of lying to America's face and delivers a scathing speech about the media and the political machine, claiming that he is here to make everything sane again. Meanwhile, Nisa walks into the 'America the Faithful Fund' building, and, after finding the place seeming deserted, stumbles upon a group of people dressed in costumes who are performing some sort of ceremony on a goat while wearing costumes that are similar to Loki's- horns and green and gold robes. As they unmask themselves after the unsuccessful ritual, Nisa catches the worshippers on camera, seemingly undermining Loki's campaign for good: showing that his followers are an actual brain-washed cult, contrary to what the god himself claims. However, during a statement, Loki spins the situation around, not only acknowledging but accepting the fact that he has worshipers because of his being a god, and even inviting the American people to join his.

Issue #3
The third issue of Vote Loki opens up with Nisa Contreras driving through Western Maryland to Washington, D.C. in her car while talking on the phone with an unidentified person about the Hydra agents from the first issue for an interview- about where they are and about their being moved to a medium security facility despite having attacked presidential candidates. All of a sudden, Nisa has to swerve out of the way because of a flaming truck that's been knocked sideways on the road- which turns out to be the truck that was carrying the Hydra agents. Nisa is doubly shocked to see a shadowy figure in the middle of the flames that looks like Angela, Loki's sister and bodyguard. However, just as Nisa is ready to catch her on camera, Angela disappears, leaving the reporter with no tangible evidence of her presence- despite that, it is clear through a scene with yet another talk show that the public still suspects Loki to have perpetrated the crime. The setting then changes to Doomstadt, Latveria- the home of Doom's Children, a terrorist organization, the members of which are inspecting two men in a van upon their entrance to the city, who reveal after their inspection that they intend to get weapons from the inside. After a brief scene where Loki talks to a fan at the Iowa State Fair about an entire meal on a stick- a partly caramelized apple, a few onion rings, and a hamburger, all on an ice cream cone, the god of mischief goes to a debate with the other two presidential candidates. Nisa, who is inside but still covering the debate, remarks that Angela, last seen at the site of the truck crash, is at the corner of the debate, looking unharmed. The scene only covers the first question of the debate, which is about the response of the U.S. to the political situation in Latveria, since Doctor Doom, a super villain and former leader of Latveria, is gone. While the two other candidates agree that the U.S.A. should send troops to Latveria, and express their discontentment with Loki's campaign ad- revealing that unlike the ad, the candidates had apparently not requested a Skype meeting with Doom's Children. However, Loki simply acknowledged the lie- arguing that it was indeed true that the female candidate, who had brought up the Skype statement, would prefer a peaceful and diplomatic solution, and that the ad was then accurate. He then asks why he is the only person being berated for lying, and that he does not think that American soldiers should go die in Latveria. Meanwhile, Nisa purchases a ticked to Latveria, and when the scene changes to a few days later, in Doomstadt, the reader can see Nisa, in disguise among a group of masked Latverians, revealed shortly thereafter to be the Latverian New Prosperity Alliance, all infiltrating Doctor Doom's castle. After they sneak in to the castle, they attempt to open a weapon cache door, failing the first time but succeeding the second. However, before they can escape the castle with their weapons, they are stopped by Doom's Children and an unidentified person from the Latverian New Prosperity Alliance creates an explosion, killing both groups. The scene flashes to a battlement above the explosion, where one of the Latverian New Prosperity Alliance men changes appearance and is revealed to be Loki in disguise, who then steps through a magic portal to see the United Metal Workers of Wisconsin. However, it is revealed in the next panel that Nisa is filming him the entire time, and the scene flashes to the public's reception of this deed while she boards a plane. But as the plane lands, it is revealed that contrary to what the public thought only hours before, Loki is now even more popular than ever before.

Issue #4
The fourth and final issue of Vote Loki  opens on Nisa Contreras in her apartment, after she had stated in the previous issue that she was completely done with trying to stop Loki. As Nisa watches Loki shaking hands with someone on television, the person turns out to be a mutant and almost blows up Loki, only to be hit into the sky with a sword by Angela, Loki's sister and his security detail. After a short private conversation with Loki, Angela ends up calling Nisa, claiming to have "information about [her] brother" that Nisa is interested in. The reporter then goes to a secluded room to meet Angela and, to her surprise, Thor. After Nisa gives the former a lifetime subscription to the Daily Bugle, Angela reveals that she got information from Loki about his being involved with Hydra, and tells both Thor and Nisa that 'Lucas from Buzzfeed', Loki's false identity in the press room at the debate shown in the first issue of Vote Loki, is actually the leader of Hydra and that the entire incident at the debate was staged for publicity. The issue then shows the reaction of the public to the news- flashing to different scenes in which the public's split over the issue of Loki is shown, starting with a scene where as Loki walks by, his fans and his opponents begin to fight. The issue then shows Loki detractors spreading trash over a Loki supporter's lawn and even setting a car on fire. However, the day before the election, Loki appears at Nisa Contreras' door, claiming that the chaos that he caused by running was not what he had wanted, and that he is the god of stories rather than the god of chaos. He then offers to talk to America to stop all the violence, promising not to lie. He then transports the two of them to a live TV audience, for the purpose of proving that he actually does care about America's best interests. However, instead of questioning him, Nisa tells Loki to instead talk to his supporters. Accepting this, he starts taking questions from the audience, but as he goes on, it is clear that despite his claim to be completely honest and reassure the public's fear, his indirect answers and lack of knowledge of what he wants to do- for instance, answering a question about health care by saying that he hasn't decided anything about it yet- and as each question comes along, his supporters believe him less and less. Loki then claims that he is no longer evil, but his supporters, now angered by the other things he's said and his revealing his excitement at manipulating Congress and the Supreme Court, have lost all support in him. By the next day- the day of the election- it is revealed that Loki will most likely not win the election. The issue then pans back to Nisa, who is on the phone with a woman who talks to her about the reporter being "the only person in the media speaking out against Loki" and her potentially getting her own TV show. Just as she hangs up, the god himself appears again at her balcony, asking if anyone would believe that he had created an entire political campaign just to bolster Nisa's future career as a voice against corrupt politics. He then leaves, and as he flies off into the sky, he picks up the phone and talks to an unidentified political candidate about compensation for his making a fool of himself on national television, and then conceding as a result.

Reception
Vote Loki has received positive reviews from critics. According to review aggregator Comic Book Roundup, the first issue received an average rating of 6.7 out of 10 and the series as a whole scored 7.9 out of 10. CriticalWrit.com called it "brilliant". Heroesdirect gave the first issue a rating of 7.0, calling it "disappointing", however the next three issues received ratings of 8.0, 8.0, and 8.6 respectively.

The first issue sold an estimated 29,500 copies.

In other media
Elements of the series were adapted into the Disney+ / Marvel Cinematic Universe miniseries Loki episode "Journey into Mystery". Most notably, a variant of Loki called President Loki leads an army of other variants of himself against Kid Loki's team of outcasts.

References

Marvel Comics titles
Thor (Marvel Comics)
Loki